Aleksandrs Kublinskis (11 September 1936 - 24 January 2018) was a Latvian composer. He is famous for the song "Noktirne" which is devoted to Riga, as well as over 200 other songs. Kublinskis used to co-operate with the Latvian group Eolika, the Moscow group "Akkord", as well as with Larisa Mondrus, Muslim Magomayev, and other singers.

External links 
  (in Russian)

References 

1936 births
2018 deaths
Latvian composers
Soviet composers
Soviet male composers
Musicians from Riga
20th-century male musicians